Sandra Brugnera (born 13 August 1943) is an Italian former figure skater who won three national titles in ladies' singles (1962–64). She competed at the 1964 Winter Olympics in Innsbruck, finishing 26th, and at nine ISU Championships, achieving her best result, 11th, at the 1962 Europeans in Geneva.

Competitive highlights

References 

Italian female single skaters
Olympic figure skaters of Italy
Figure skaters at the 1964 Winter Olympics
1943 births
Living people